Rajanala Nageswara Rao (1928–1959) was an Indian actor known for his works in Telugu cinema, and was one of the lead actors of his time. He is best known for his works in award-winning hits such as Devadasu (1953), Kanna Talli (1953), Paropakaram (1953), Raju Peda (1954), Aggi Ramudu (1954), Ilavelupu (1954), Donga Ramudu (1955), Maya Bazaar (1957), and Pelli Naati Pramanalu (1958).

Early life
He was born in 1928. He has studied in the Aligarh Muslim University. He joined with the Paramount theater as a manager. He worked under the direction of P. Pullaiah in the film Sankranthi.

Dialogues
He is particularly good at delivering the dialogues with punch. Some of the memorable dialogues are:
 ade debba, ade cheyyi - Appu Chesi Pappu Koodu
 babulu gadi debba ante golkonda abba - Donga Ramudu
 bhale mama bhale, ade mana takshana kartavyam - Mayabazar
 emden! - Pellinaati Pramanalu

Filmography

Death
He died of Tuberculosis at the age of 31 on 5 August 1959. Sabhash Ramudu was his last major release. He finished the work on other unreleased films Bhaktha Sabari and Jagannatakam before his untimely death.

References

External links
 

Telugu male actors
1928 births
1959 deaths
20th-century Indian male actors
Date of death missing